Veysel Cihan (born 4 February 1976) is a retired Turkish professional football player who played as a striker.

He played for the Turkey A2 national football team four times, scoring zero goals.

References

External links
Guardian Stats Centre

1976 births
Living people
Turkish footballers
Turkey B international footballers
Antalyaspor footballers
Denizlispor footballers
Gaziantepspor footballers
Konyaspor footballers
Beşiktaş J.K. footballers
Boluspor footballers
Süper Lig players
People from Avanos

Association football forwards